Amina Ben Doua is a Tunisian TV presenter and producer and a famous radio host. She presented in Hannibal TV and Attessia TV. 
She joined Mosaique FM in 2003. Since 2008 she hosts the daily show "Forum Mosaique".
She got married on 15 June 2019.

Work

Radio 
2003–2008: Ahla Sbah (Mosaïque FM)
2008: Forum (Mosaïque FM)

Television 
2015: Het Nahkiw (Hannibal TV)
2016: Houna Al An (Attessia TV)

References

Tunisian mass media people
Tunisian women
Living people
Year of birth missing (living people)